Laiyi Township is a mountain indigenous township in Pingtung County, Taiwan at the foot of Dawu Mountain. Laiyi is the native home of the Paiwan people. Many ancient customs and religious rites are still practiced in Laiyi, which has been regarded as the traditional religious center for the Paiwan Tribe.

Laiyi is scenic with many streams spanned by suspension bridges, waterfalls and cliffs, and aboriginal totem sculptures.

Administrative divisions
The township comprises seven villages: Danlin, Gulou, Laiyi, Nanhe, Wangjia, Wenle and Yilin.

References

External links

 Government website 

Townships in Pingtung County